The Peace of Wild Things is the second full-length studio album by Paper Route, released on September 11, 2012.

The vinyl LP version was pressed at United Record Pressing in Nashville, TN.

Track listing

Charts

References

Paper Route (band) albums
2012 albums